The 2009 CONCACAF U-20 Championship qualifying tournament determined the Caribbean and Central American Under-20 association football national teams that would participate in the 2009 CONCACAF U-20 Championship, which itself will qualify national teams to the 2009 FIFA U-20 World Cup. Qualification began on 14 May 2008. The final round of qualification was a one-game playoff on 2 March 2009, between the runner-up from the Caribbean zone, St Vincent and the Grenadines, and the 3rd-place finisher from the Central American zone, Honduras. The three North American zone nations, Canada, Mexico, and the United States, as well as tournament hosts Trinidad and Tobago, were automatically entered into the final tournament without need for qualification.

Caribbean zone

First round
The first round consisted of five groups of four teams. The five group winners and top four group runners-up from each group advanced to the second qualification round.

Group A
All Group A matches were hosted by Asociación de Fútbol de Cuba, the governing by for association football in Cuba. All matches were played at Estadio Pedro Marrero in Havana.

Group B
All Group B matches were hosted by the Cayman Islands Football Association, the governing body for association football in the Cayman Islands, and were played at the Truman Bodden Sports Complex in George Town.

Group C
All Group C matches were hosted by Arubaanse Voetbal Bond, the governing body for association football in Aruba. All matches were played at Trinidad Stadium in Oranjestad.

Group D
All Group D matches were hosted by the Grenada Football Association, the governing body for association football in Grenada. All matches were played at Tanteen Recreational Ground in St. George's.

Group E
All Group E matches were hosted by Nederlands Antilliaanse Voetbal Unie, the governing by for association football in the Netherlands Antilles. All matches were played at Stadion Ergilio Hato in Willemstad.

Second round
The second round consists of three groups of three. The three group winners from each group as well as the best-performing runner-up will move on to the third and final round of the CFU region's qualification tournament.

Group F
All Group F matches were hosted by Federación Dominicana de Fútbol, the governing by for association football in the Dominican Republic. All matches were played at Estadio Félix Sánchez in Santo Domingo.

Group G
All Group G matches were hosted by Nederlands Antilliaanse Voetbal Unie, the governing by for association football in the Netherlands Antilles. All matches were played at Stadion Ergilio Hato in Willemstad.

Group H
All Group H matches were hosted by Arubaanse Voetbal Bond, the governing by for association football in the Aruba. All matches were played at Trinidad Stadium in Oranjestad.

Third round
The final round of CFU qualification were hosted by, the governing body for association football in Saint Vincent and the Grenadines. The matches were played at Victoria Park in Kingstown, the capital of Saint Vincent and the Grenadines. The group winner, Jamaica, qualified for the tournament proper, and the runner up from the Caribbean region, St Vincent and the Grenadines, as group runner-up, earned the right to a one-game playoff with the 3rd-place finisher from the Central American region, Honduras, to determine the 8th and final qualifier for the tournament proper.

Central American zone
The Central American zone comprises two groups. One group has three teams and the other has four teams. The two group winners will move on to the tournament. The runner-up from each group will play a two-legged playoff to determine the third place team from the region. The third place team will play the runner-up from the Caribbean region for the final spot in the tournament proper.

Group 1
The matches played in Group 1 were hosted by Federación Nacional Autónoma de Fútbol de Honduras, the governing body for association football in Honduras. All matches were played at Estadio Tiburcio Carías Andino in Tegucigalpa, the capital city of Honduras.

Group 2
All of the matches in Group 2 were hosted by Federación Nacional de Fútbol de Guatemala, the governing body for association football in Guatemala. All matches were played at Estadio Mateo Flores in Guatemala City.

Playoff
The two group runners-up faced off in a two-legged playoff for third place rights in the region. Honduras, as winners of the 3rd place playoff, advanced to face the runner up from the Caribbean qualification, Saint Vincent and the Grenadines, to become the 8th and final qualifier for the tournament proper.

Caribbean/Central American playoff
Honduras, as winner of the 3rd place playoff in Central American qualification, faced Saint Vincent and the Grenadines, the runner-up from the Caribbean zone tournament, for the final place in the tournament proper. The match was a one-game playoff on 2 March in Macoya, Trinidad four days prior to the opening of the tournament proper.

References

External links
 CONCACAF Under-20 homepage

Qualifying
2009